Abraham Albert "Al" Yuzpe (born 1938) is a Canadian obstetrician-gynecologist known for his work on human fertility and emergency contraception. The Yuzpe regimen, named after him, is a method of reducing potential unwanted pregnancies, including pregnancy from rape. He published the first studies demonstrating the method's safety and efficacy in 1974.

Life and career
Yuzpe earned his MD, MSc. and completed his fellowship in Obstetrics and Gynecology at the University of Western Ontario in London, Ontario. Yuzpe founded one of the first IVF centres in Canada at the University of Western Ontario  in 1982.

He was a Fellow of the Medical Research Council of Canada for two years, with his research focusing on the development and refinement of fertility promoting drugs, including clomiphene citrate and human menopausal gonadotropins.

Yuzpe joined the Faculty of Medicine, Department of Obstetrics and Gynecology, where he held the position of Full Professor until retiring in 1995. He was co-founder and co-director of Genesis Fertility Centre, and then became co-founder and co-director of Olive Fertility Centre where he currently practices. Yuzpe has received the Canadian Fertility and Andrology Society Award of Excellence in Reproductive Medicine, and The Society of Obstetricians and Gynecologists Presidents Award "For his distinguished career in academic reproductive endocrinology and infertility and his dedication to women's health in Canada and abroad."

Selected publications
AA Yuzpe, Z Liu, MR Fluker Rescue intracytoplasmic sperm injection (ICSI)—salvaging in vitro fertilization (IVF) cycles after total or near-total fertilization failure. Fertility and sterility, 2000
MR Fluker, WM Hooper, AA Yuzpe Withholding gonadotropins. Fertility and sterility, 1999
MD Hornstein, R Hemmings, AA Yuzpe Use of nafarelin versus placebo after reductive laparoscopic surgery for endometriosis. Fertility and sterility, 1997
MD Hornstein, AA Yuzpe, KA Burry, LR Heinrichs Prospective randomized double-blind trial of 3 versus 6 months of nafarelin therapy for endometriosis associated pelvic pain. Fertility and sterility 1995
M Alsalili, A Yuzpe, I Tummon, J Parker, J Martin Pregnancy: Cumulative pregnancy rates and pregnancy outcome after in-vitro fertilization:> 5000 cycles at one centre... - Human ..., 1995
CR Newton, MT Hearn, AA Yuzpe Psychological assessment and follow-up after in vitro fertilization: assessing the impact of failure. Fertility and sterility, 1990
AA Yuzpe Pneumoperitoneum needle and trocar injuries in laparoscopy. A survey on possible contributing factors and prevention. The Journal of Reproductive Medicine, 1990
MT Hearn, AA Yuzpe, SE Brown Psychological characteristics of in vitro fertilization participants. American journal of ..., 1987
Richard P. Dickey, A. Albert Yuzpe (1985). Managing Cyclomen (Danazol) Patients.
Jacques-E. Rioux, A. Albert Yuzpe (1982). Gynecologic endoscopic equipment.
AA Yuzpe, RP Smith, AW Rademaker A multicenter clinical investigation employing ethinyl estradiol combined with dl-norgestrel as postcoital contraceptive agent.  Fertility and sterility, 1982
R Minielly, AA Yuzpe, CG Drake (1979). Subarachnoid hemorrhage secondary to ruptured cerebral aneurysm in pregnancy Obstetrics & Gynecology, 1979
Jacques-E. Rioux, A. Albert Yuzpe (1979). Evaluation of Female Sterilization Procedures
AA Yuzpe, WJ Lancee (1977). Ethinylestradiol and dl-norgestrel as a postcoital contraceptive.  Fertility and sterility'', 1977
AA Yuzpe, HJ Thurlow, I Ramzy... Post coital contraception—A pilot study. The Journal of ..., 1974
A. Albert Yuzpe, Jacques E. Rioux (1973). A manual of laparoscopy

References

External links
Dr. Al Yuzpe MSC, MD, FRCSC, Co-Director via Olive Fertility Centre

Living people
1936 births
Canadian gynaecologists